Leonid Alekseevich Kamarovsky (March 15, 1846 – August 12, 1912, Леонид Алексеевич Камаровский) was a professor of international law at Moscow State University.  He is considered to be one of the most influential pre-revolutionary Russian international lawyers.

From 1890 to 1903 he taught at the Imperial Lyceum of Tsarevich Nikolai. He taught at several other Russian universities. From 1909 to 1912, he was a member of the Moscow city duma.

See also
List of Russian legal historians

References
Комаровский Л.А. Об идее мира между народами (On the Idea of Peace Between Peoples/Nations) // Русская мысль. 1884. Кн. 7.
Комаровский Л.А. Вопрос о международной организации (On International Organization/Unification)

Russian legal scholars
International law scholars
Moscow State University alumni
1912 deaths
1846 births